is a Japanese footballer currently playing as a midfielder for YSCC Yokohama.

Career statistics

Club
.

Notes

References

1997 births
Living people
Association football people from Chiba Prefecture
Japanese footballers
Japanese expatriate footballers
Association football midfielders
Regionalliga players
J3 League players
YSCC Yokohama players
Japanese expatriate sportspeople in Germany
Expatriate footballers in Germany